Culcita is the scientific name of two genera of organisms and may refer to:

Culcita (echinoderm), a genus of sea stars in the family Oreasteridae
Culcita (plant), a genus of ferns in the family Culcitaceae